is a 1969 Japanese fantasy horror film directed by Kimiyoshi Yasuda and Yoshiyuki Kuroda. It is the third in a trilogy of films produced in the late 1960s, all of which focus around traditional Japanese monsters known as yōkai.

Plot
When a criminal boss Higuruma kills his rival and a witness, an old man who tried to protect a sacred site, he believes a young girl in the old man's care, Miyo, was also a witness and escaped with the evidence of his criminal activity. Higuruma and his men hunt down Miyo as she tries to find her missing father with the help of a swordsman, Hyakasuro, while the boss and his men are haunted by the curse of the yokai of the land they desecrated.

Release
Yokai Monsters: Along with Ghosts was released in Japan on March 21, 1969. It was released in the United States by Daiei International Films with English subtitles in 1969. The film set for a 4K DVD and Blu-ray release by Kadokawa in August 18. The Blu-ray will also be packaged with Yokai Monsters: 100 Monsters and Yokai Monsters: Spook Warfare in a box set due on September 24.

References

Sources

External links

1969 films
1960s Japanese-language films
Daiei Film tokusatsu films
1960s children's fantasy films
1960s monster movies
1960s fantasy films
Films directed by Kimiyoshi Yasuda
Films based on Japanese myths and legends
Works about yōkai
1960s Japanese films